James DeKoven (September 19, 1831 – March 19, 1879) was a priest, an educator and a leader of Anglican Ritualism in the Episcopal Church.

Life
DeKoven was born in Middletown, Connecticut and educated at Columbia College. In 1851 he was admitted to General Theological Seminary and was ordained as a deacon in 1854 in Middletown. He accepted a teaching position at Nashotah House in Wisconsin and became rector of the nearby St. John Chrysostom parish in Delafield. It was there that he was ordained as a priest by Bishop Jackson Kemper. While in Delafield he established a school called St. John's Hall. In 1859 he became the warden of Racine College and continued to be at the center of that school for the rest of his life.

He spoke in support of the cause for ritualism at the National Conventions in 1871 and 1874. DeKoven was nominated several times and even elected as a bishop, but was never ordained to the episcopate. He was nominated or elected as bishop of Massachusetts (1873), Wisconsin (1874), Fond du Lac (1875), and Illinois (1875). In the Illinois election he was chosen by the clergy and the laity, but a majority of the standing committee refused to endorse his election. The reason given by the standing committee was his ‘doctrine on the Holy Eucharist.’ An open letter published in the Milwaukee paper on January 14, 1874, was at least partly responsible for his Eucharistic doctrine being questioned. The signers of this letter included three faculty members from Nashotah House. He also addressed the Church Congress (a series of national meetings to provide a vision for the Episcopal Church) in 1876.

DeKoven remained in Wisconsin for the rest of his life, turning down calls to serve at some of the nation's largest and wealthiest parish churches, including Trinity Church in New York City, Church of the Advent in Boston, and St. Mark's Church in Philadelphia. After suffering a fall on the ice, DeKoven died on March 19, 1879. He is buried on the grounds of Racine College, which is now The DeKoven Center, in Racine, Wisconsin. His feast day is March 22.

Death and legacy
After suffering a fall on the ice, De Koven died on Saint Joseph's Day (March 19) in 1879. He is buried on the grounds of Racine College, now the DeKoven Center, in Racine, Wisconsin.<ref>[http://anglicanhistory.org/bios/dekoven/ Life of the Reverend James de Koven, D.D./ Thomas C. Reeves, James De Koven, Anglican Saint (1978.)]</ref> His feast day is March 22.

Popular culture
DeKoven's image is used as a graphic by the rock band Monstrance, which is composed of clergy from the Episcopal Diocese of Milwaukee.

References

Further reading
 Sermons Preached on Various Occasions by James De Koven (New York: D. Appleton and Company, 1888)
 The Story of a College by James De Koven (Manuscript, dated Middletown, Connecticut, 1862)
 The Catholic Movement in the American Episcopal Church by George E. DeMille (Philadelphia: Church Historical Society, 1941)
 Lesser Feasts and Fasts (New York: Church Publishing, 1979)
 The Life of the Reverend James De Koven D.D.: Sometime Warden of Racine College by William Cox Pope (New York: James Pott & Company, 1899)
 A History of the Episcopal Church'' by Robert W. Prichard (Harrisburg: Morehouse, 1999)

External links
 
Material by and about James DeKoven from Project Canterbury
Solitaries of DeKoven, a religious order of hermits
The DeKoven Center, retreat and conference center

1831 births
1879 deaths
People from Middletown, Connecticut
American Episcopal priests
19th-century American Episcopalians
Anglican saints
American Anglo-Catholics
Religious leaders from Wisconsin
Writers from Racine, Wisconsin
19th-century Christian saints
Nashotah House faculty
Racine College people
Writers from Connecticut
Accidental deaths from falls
Accidental deaths in Wisconsin
Anglo-Catholic clergy
Columbia College (New York) alumni
General Theological Seminary alumni
19th-century American clergy